The 2018–19 Golden State Warriors season was the 73rd season of the franchise in the National Basketball Association (NBA), and its 57th in the San Francisco Bay Area. The Warriors entered the season as the two-time defending NBA champions, having won back-to-back NBA championships. The Warriors attempted their first "three-peat" in franchise history, but were defeated by the Toronto Raptors in the 2019 NBA Finals. This was the Warriors' final season at Oracle Arena in Oakland, before moving to the new Chase Center in San Francisco, beginning with the 2019–20 NBA season. The Warriors won the Pacific Division title and Western Conference Championship for the fifth consecutive season. Golden State made the playoffs for the seventh consecutive season, a new franchise record. The previous record was six, in the team's first six years of existence between 1947 and 1952. Golden State recorded 50 wins for the sixth consecutive season, a franchise record. In the postseason, the Warriors defeated the Los Angeles Clippers 4–2 in the First Round, the Houston Rockets 4–2 in the Western Conference Semi-finals, and swept the Portland Trail Blazers 4–0 in the Western Conference Finals. The Warriors' run ended in the NBA Finals, where they lost 4–2 to the Toronto Raptors. Golden State made their fifth consecutive Finals appearance and are the second team in NBA history to achieve this feat after the Boston Celtics made ten straight between 1957–1966. The Warriors playoff run was riddled with injuries, with DeMarcus Cousins (quadricep tear in the First Round), Stephen Curry (dislocated finger in the Semi-finals), Kevin Durant (calf strain in the Semi-finals, ruptured achilles in the Finals), Andre Iguodala (calf strain in the Western Conference Finals), Klay Thompson (hamstring strain and a torn ACL in the Finals), and Kevon Looney (fractured collar bone in the Finals) all missing a combined total of 26 games.

Thompson broke the NBA record for three-pointers made in a game with 14, surpassing the 13 made by teammate Curry in the 2016–17 season. Curry broke the NBA record for most three-pointers made in the playoffs with 470. The record was held by Ray Allen, who had 385. This season Curry also moved into third on the all-time career three-point scoring list with 2,483; only Allen and Reggie Miller having made more three-pointers during the regular season in NBA history. Curry, Durant, and Thompson were all named to the All-Star Game. Durant was named MVP of the game, the fourth time a Warrior player has won the award and first since 1967. Curry and Durant were named to the All-NBA Team. Green and Thompson were named to All-Defensive Team, it was Green's fifth consecutive selection which tied Nate Thurmond for the most selections in franchise history. With the addition of free agent DeMarcus Cousins in the off-season, the Warriors had five All-Stars on their roster that were named to the 2018 All-Star Game. This is the sixth time in NBA history a team has had five All-Stars from the previous season, and the first since the Boston Celtics in 1976. From November 15 to 21, the Warriors lost four games in a row for the first time since the 2012–13 season, and for the first time under the tenure of Steve Kerr.

Following the season, Durant signed with the Brooklyn Nets as a free agent, Iguodala was traded to the Memphis Grizzlies, Cousins signed with the Los Angeles Lakers as a free agent, and Shaun Livingston retired.

Draft

Roster

Records

NBA records

Individual

Regular season
 Most three-pointers made in game: 14 (Klay Thompson, vs Chicago Bulls on October 29, 2018
 Most games with 10+ three-pointers in a season: 6, (Stephen Curry, up to and including game against Minnesota Timberwolves on March 29, 2019. He's made 10+ 15 times in his career)
 Most three-pointers made in a half: 10, (Klay Thompson, tied with Chandler Parsons)
 Most three-pointers made without missing: 10, (Klay Thompson, 10 of 10 3FG vs Los Angeles Lakers on January 21, 2019)
 Most consecutive games with at least five three-pointers: 7, (Stephen Curry, first seven games of the season)
 Most games with 11+ three-pointers: 13, (Stephen Curry, up to and including game against Minnesota Timberwolves on March 29, 2019)
 Most three-pointers made in the first four games of the season: 22, (Stephen Curry, broke his own record of 21 in the 2015–16 season)

Postseason
 Most three-pointers made in the playoffs: 470 (Stephen Curry, surpassed Ray Allen's 385 for the NBA record)
 Most points in a four-game playoff series: 146 (Stephen Curry against Portland Trail Blazers in the Western Conference Finals. Previous record of 145 was held by Shaquille O'Neal)
 Most three-pointers made in a four-game playoff series: 26 (Stephen Curry against Portland Trail Blazers in the Western Conference Finals. He broke his own record of 22)
 Most consecutive playoff games with a made three-pointer: 112 - ongoing streak (Stephen Curry, has made a three-pointer in every playoff game he's played in)
 Most consecutive playoff games with a made three-pointer at home: 58 - ongoing streak (Stephen Curry)
 Most consecutive playoff games with a made three-pointer on the road: 54 - ongoing streak (Stephen Curry)
 Most points scored in a first half in a playoff game: 38, (Kevin Durant, tied with Charles Barkley)
 First teammates to both have a triple-double in the same postseason game: Draymond Green and Stephen Curry (against Portland Trail Blazers in Game 4)

Team

Regular season
 Most points scored in a first quarter: 51, (vs the Denver Nuggets on January 15, 2019)
 Most three-pointers made in a half: 17, (17 of 27 3FG vs Chicago Bulls on October 29, 2018)
 Most combined three-pointers made in a game: 43, (vs New Orleans Pelicans on January 16, 2019. Warriors made 24, Pelicans made 19)

Postseason
 Most consecutive playoff series with a road win: 23 (surpassed the Miami Heat who had 19. The Warriors have won a game on the road in every series since they played the Denver Nuggets in the First Round of the 2012–13 season.)
 Longest unanswered run in an NBA Finals game: 20 (vs Toronto Raptors on June 2, 2019, Game 2 of the 2019 NBA Finals. The Warriors went on a 20-0 run. The streak started at 4.1 seconds left in the 2nd quarter until 6:58 left in the 3rd quarter.)

Franchise records

Individual

Regular season
 Most three-pointers made: 2,483 (Stephen Curry, he's currently third on the all-time career 3-point scoring list)

Postseason
 Most triple-doubles in the postseason: 10 (Draymond Green. Green is tied fourth all-time for most triple doubles in the playoffs)
 Most playoff games played: 123 (Klay Thompson, missed his first ever playoff game in the NBA Finals, Game 3)

Team

Regular season
 Most three-pointers in a game: 24 (twice this season, vs Chicago Bulls on October 29, 2018 and vs New Orleans Pelicans on January 16, 2019
 Most points in a half: 92, vs Chicago Bulls on October 29, 2018. 92 is the second most points in a first half in NBA history, behind the Phoenix Suns 107 in 1990. 92 is the fifth most points in any half in NBA history, again behind the Suns 107
 Most three-pointers in a quarter: 10, (10 of 14 3FG vs the Denver Nuggets on January 15, 2019)
 Most three-pointers made in a season: 1,078
 Most consecutive 50+ win seasons: Six (The Warriors had only reached 50 wins four times in the previous five decades, in 1971–72, 1975–76, 1991–92, and 1993–94)

Postseason
 Most consecutive NBA Finals appearances: Five (Only the Boston Celtics have appeared in more consecutively in NBA history. They appeared in ten straight between 1957 and 1966)
 Most consecutive Western Conference Finals appearances: Five (only the Los Angeles Lakers have appeared in more consecutive Finals, with eight between 1982 and 1989)
 Most consecutive playoff series wins: Nine (longest streak since the Miami Heat won eleven in a row)
 Most consecutive playoff appearances: Seven (The previous record was six, in the team's first six years of existence between 1947 and 1952)

Standings

Division

Conference

Game log

Preseason

|- style="background:#fbb;"
| 1
| September 29
| Minnesota
| 
| Curry (21)
| Bell (7)
| Green (8)
| Oracle Arena19,596
| 0–1
|- style="background:#cfc"
| 2
| October 5
| Sacramento
| 
| Thompson (30)
| Derrickson (7)
| Durant (7)
| KeyArena17,074
| 1–1
|- style="background:#fbb;"
| 3
| October 8
| Phoenix
| 
| Curry (23)
| Jones (8)
| Jones, Durant (5)
| Oracle Arena19,596
| 1–2
|- style="background:#fbb"
| 4
| October 10
| @ LA Lakers
| 
| Curry (23)
| Durant (12)
| Curry (5)
| T-Mobile Arena1,763
| 1–3
|- style="background:#fbb"
| 5
| October 12
| LA Lakers
| 
| Thompson (21)
| McKinnie (7)
| Green (5)
| SAP Center18,523
| 1–4

Regular season

|- style="background:#cfc"
| 1
| October 16
| Oklahoma City
| 
| Stephen Curry (32)
| Draymond Green (13)
| Stephen Curry (9)
| Oracle Arena19,596
| 1–0
|- style="background:#cfc"
| 2
| October 19
| @ Utah
| 
| Kevin Durant (38)
| Durant, Green (9)
| Stephen Curry (8)
| Vivint Smart Home Arena18,306
| 2–0
|- style="background:#fcc"
| 3
| October 21
| @ Denver
| 
| Stephen Curry (30)
| Kevin Durant (11)
| Kevin Durant (7)
| Pepsi Center19,520
| 2–1
|- style="background:#cfc"
| 4
| October 22
| Phoenix
| 
| Stephen Curry (29)
| Alfonzo McKinnie (7)
| Curry, Green (8)
| Oracle Arena19,596
| 3–1
|- style="background:#cfc"
| 5
| October 24
| Washington
| 
| Stephen Curry (51)
| Kevin Durant (8)
| Draymond Green (12)
| Oracle Arena19,596
| 4–1
|- style="background:#cfc"
| 6
| October 26
| @ New York
| 
| Kevin Durant (41)
| Kevin Durant (9)
| Draymond Green (6)
| Madison Square Garden19,812
| 5–1
|- style="background:#cfc"
| 7
| October 28
| @ Brooklyn
| 
| Stephen Curry (35)
| Kevin Durant (8)
| Draymond Green (13)
| Barclays Center17,732
| 6–1
|- style="background:#cfc"
| 8
| October 29
| @ Chicago
| 
| Klay Thompson (52)
| Alfonzo McKinnie (10)
| Draymond Green (11)
| United Center21,076
| 7–1
|- style="background:#cfc"
| 9
| October 31
| New Orleans
| 
| Stephen Curry (37)
| Draymond Green (14)
| Stephen Curry (9)
| Oracle Arena19,596
|8–1

|- style="background:#cfc"
| 10
| November 2
| Minnesota
| 
| Kevin Durant (33)
| Kevin Durant (13)
| Draymond Green (11)
| Oracle Arena19,596
| 9–1
|- style="background:#cfc"
| 11
| November 5
| Memphis
| 
| Klay Thompson (27)
| Kevon Looney (9)
| Stephen Curry (7)
| Oracle Arena19,596
| 10–1
|- style="background:#fcc;"
| 12
| November 8
| Milwaukee
| 
| Klay Thompson (24)
| Durant, Looney, Bell, McKinnie (5)
| Kevin Durant (9)
| Oracle Arena19,596
| 10–2
|- style="background:#cfc;"
| 13
| November 10
| Brooklyn
| 
| Kevin Durant (28)
| Jordan Bell (8)
| Kevin Durant (11)
| Oracle Arena 19,596
| 11–2
|- style="background:#fcc;"
| 14
| November 12
| @ L.A. Clippers
| 
| Kevin Durant (33)
| Draymond Green (14)
| Kevin Durant (10)
| Staples Center 19,068
| 11–3
|- style="background:#cfc;"
| 15
| November 13
| Atlanta
| 
| Kevin Durant (29)
| Jonas Jerebko (13)
| Quinn Cook (6)
| Oracle Arena 19,596
| 12–3
|- style="background:#fcc;"
| 16
| November 15
| @ Houston
| 
| Kevin Durant (20)
| Andre Iguodala (6)
| Draymond Green (5)
| Toyota Center 18,055
| 12–4
|- style="background:#fcc;"
| 17
| November 17
| @ Dallas
| 
| Kevin Durant (32)
| Jonas Jerebko (10)
| Jerebko, Thompson, Livingston, Iguodala (4)
| American Airlines Center 20,260
| 12–5
|- style="background:#fcc;"
| 18
| November 18
| @ San Antonio
| 
| Kevin Durant (26)
| Durant, Jerebko (10)
| Kevin Durant (6)
| AT&T Center18,354
| 12–6
|- style="background:#fcc;"
| 19
| November 21
| Oklahoma City
| 
| Thompson, Durant (27)
| Kevin Durant (14)
| Quinn Cook (6)
| Oracle Arena19,596
| 12–7
|- style="background:#cfc;"
| 20
| November 23
| Portland
| 
| Kevin Durant (32)
| Durant, Bell (8)
| Kevin Durant (7)
| Oracle Arena19,596
| 13–7
|- style="background:#cfc;"
| 21
| November 24
| Sacramento
| 
| Kevin Durant (44)
| Kevin Durant (13)
| Kevin Durant (7)
| Oracle Arena19,596
| 14–7
|- style="background:#cfc;"
| 22
| November 26
| Orlando
| 
| Kevin Durant (49)
| Durant, Looney, Cook (6)
| Kevin Durant (9)
| Oracle Arena19,596
| 15–7
|- style="background:#fcc;"
| 23
| November 29
| @ Toronto
| 
| Kevin Durant (51)
| Kevin Durant (11)
| Shaun Livingston (7)
| Scotiabank Arena19,800
| 15–8

|- style="background:#fcc;"
| 24
| December 1
| @ Detroit
| 
| Kevin Durant (28)
| Klay Thompson (8)
| Kevin Durant (7)
| Little Caesars Arena20,332
| 15–9
|- style="background:#cfc;"
| 25
| December 3
| @ Atlanta
| 
| Stephen Curry (30)
| Klay Thompson (9)
| Kevin Durant (8)
| State Farm Arena16,631
| 16–9
|- style="background:#cfc;"
| 26
| December 5
| @ Cleveland
| 
| Stephen Curry (30)
| Kevin Durant (10)
| Kevin Durant (9)
| Quicken Loans Arena19,432
| 17–9
|- style="background:#cfc;"
| 27
| December 7
| @ Milwaukee
| 
| Thompson, Curry (20)
| Durant, Iguodala (8)
| Stephen Curry (8)
| Fiserv Forum17,852
| 18–9
|- style="background:#cfc;"
| 28
| December 10
| Minnesota
| 
| Stephen Curry (38)
| Draymond Green (10)
| Draymond Green (7)
| Oracle Arena19,596
| 19–9
|- style="background:#fcc;"
| 29
| December 12
| Toronto
| 
| Kevin Durant (30)
| Durant, Bell (7)
| Draymond Green (7)
| Oracle Arena19,596
| 19–10
|- style="background:#cfc;"
| 30
| December 14
| @ Sacramento
| 
| Stephen Curry (35)
| Draymond Green (14)
| Draymond Green (10)
| Golden 1 Center17,583
| 20–10
|- style="background:#cfc;"
| 31
| December 17
| Memphis
| 
| Kevin Durant (23)
| Curry, Green (7)
| Durant, Green (5)
| Oracle Arena19,596
| 21–10
|- style="background:#fcc;"
| 32
| December 19
| @ Utah
| 
| Stephen Curry (32)
| Draymond Green (12)
| Shaun Livingston (5)
| Vivint Smart Home Arena18,306
| 21–11
|- style="background:#cfc;"
| 33
| December 22
| Dallas
| 
| Kevin Durant (29)
| Kevin Durant (12)
| Kevin Durant (8)
| Oracle Arena19,596
| 22–11
|- style="background:#cfc;"
| 34
| December 23
| L.A. Clippers
| 
| Stephen Curry (42)
| Kevin Durant (12)
| Kevin Durant (6)
| Oracle Arena19,596
| 23–11
|- style="background:#fcc;"
| 35
| December 25
| L.A. Lakers
| 
| Andre Iguodala (23)
| Kevin Durant (7)
| Kevin Durant (7)
| Oracle Arena19,596
| 23–12
|- style="background:#fcc;"
| 36
| December 27
| Portland
| 
| Stephen Curry (29)
| Draymond Green (11)
| Kevin Durant (10)
| Oracle Arena19,596
| 23–13
|- style="background:#cfc;"
| 37
| December 29
| @ Portland
| 
| Klay Thompson (32)
| Draymond Green (9)
| Stephen Curry (8)
| Moda Center19,797
| 24–13
|- style="background:#cfc;"
| 38
| December 31
| @ Phoenix
| 
| Stephen Curry (34)
| Stephen Curry (9)
| Draymond Green (7)
| Talking Stick Resort Arena16,906
| 25–13

|- style="background:#fcc;"
| 39
| January 3
| Houston
| 
| Stephen Curry (35)
| Draymond Green (11)
| Draymond Green (8)
| Oracle Arena19,596
| 25–14
|- style="background:#cfc;"
| 40
| January 5
| @ Sacramento
| 
| Stephen Curry (42)
| Jonas Jerebko (8)
| Kevin Durant (9)
| Golden 1 Center17,583
| 26–14
|- style="background:#cfc;"
| 41
| January 8
| New York
| 
| Klay Thompson (43)
| Draymond Green (11)
| Stephen Curry (14)
| Oracle Arena19,596
| 27–14
|- style="background:#cfc;"
| 42
| January 11
| Chicago
| 
| Klay Thompson (30)
| Green, Looney (7)
| Stephen Curry (8)
| Oracle Arena19,596
| 28–14
|- style="background:#cfc;"
| 43
| January 13
| @ Dallas
| 
| Stephen Curry (48)
| Jonas Jerebko (8)
| Andre Iguodala (6)
| American Airlines Center20,340
| 29–14
|- style="background:#cfc;"
| 44
| January 15
| @ Denver
| 
| Curry, Thompson (31)
| Kevon Looney (12)
| Draymond Green (13)
| Pepsi Center19,896
| 30–14
|- style="background:#cfc;"
| 45
| January 16
| New Orleans
| 
| Stephen Curry (41)
| Kevin Durant (15)
| Draymond Green (14)
| Oracle Arena19,596
| 31–14
|- style="background:#cfc;"
| 46
| January 18
| @ L.A. Clippers
| 
| Stephen Curry (28)
| Draymond Green (8)
| Draymond Green (9)
| Staples Center19,068
| 32–14
|- style="background:#cfc;"
| 47
| January 21
| @ L.A. Lakers
| 
| Klay Thompson (44)
| DeMarcus Cousins (9)
| Stephen Curry (12)
| Staples Center18,997
| 33–14
|- style="background:#cfc;"
| 48
| January 24
| @ Washington
| 
| Stephen Curry (38)
| Draymond Green (15)
| Draymond Green (7)
| Capital One Arena20,409
| 34–14
|- style="background:#cfc;"
| 49
| January 26
| @ Boston
| 
| Kevin Durant (33)
| Draymond Green (11)
| Draymond Green (8)
| TD Garden18,624
| 35–14
|- style="background:#cfc;"
| 50
| January 28
| @ Indiana
| 
| Stephen Curry (26)
| Cousins, Curry, Iguodala, Cook (6)
| Kevin Durant (7)
| Bankers Life Fieldhouse17,923
| 36–14
|- style="background:#fcc;"
| 51
| January 31
| Philadelphia
| 
| Stephen Curry (41)
| Draymond Green (8)
| Draymond Green (10)
| Oracle Arena19,596
| 36–15

|- style="background:#cfc;"
| 52
| February 2
| L.A. Lakers
| 
| Klay Thompson (28)
| DeMarcus Cousins (10)
| Kevin Durant (11)
| Oracle Arena19,596
| 37–15
|- style="background:#cfc;"
| 53
| February 6
| San Antonio
| 
| Klay Thompson (26)
| Kevin Durant (8)
| Kevin Durant (9)
| Oracle Arena19,596
| 38–15
|- style="background:#cfc;"
| 54
| February 8
| @ Phoenix
| 
| Klay Thompson (25)
| Kevin Durant (8)
| Stephen Curry (7)
| Talking Stick Resort Arena17,081
| 39–15
|- style="background:#cfc;"
| 55
| February 10
| Miami
| 
| Kevin Durant (39)
| Draymond Green (7)
| Draymond Green (14)
| Oracle Arena19,596
| 40–15
|- style="background:#cfc;"
| 56
| February 12
| Utah
| 
| Kevin Durant (28)
| DeMarcus Cousins (10)
| Kevin Durant (7)
| Oracle Arena19,596
| 41–15
|- style="background:#fcc;"
| 57
| February 13
| @ Portland
| 
| Durant, Curry (32)
| Jordan Bell (9)
| Klay Thompson (8)
| Moda Center19,549
| 41–16
|- align="center"
|colspan="9" bgcolor="#bbcaff"|All-Star Break
|- style="background:#cfc;"
| 58
| February 21
| Sacramento
| 
| Stephen Curry (36)
| DeMarcus Cousins (10)
| Demarcus Cousins (14)
| Oracle Arena19,596
| 42–16
|- style="background:#fcc;"
| 59
| February 23
| Houston
| 
| Kevin Durant (29)
| Demarcus Cousins (14)
| Stephen Curry (7)
| Oracle Arena19,596
| 42–17
|- style="background:#cfc;"
| 60
| February 25
| @ Charlotte
| 
| Klay Thompson (26)
| Demarcus Cousins (11)
| Demarcus Cousins (10)
| Spectrum Center19,419
| 43–17
|- style="background:#fcc;"
| 61
| February 27
| @ Miami
| 
| Klay Thompson (36)
| Curry, Bell, Looney (7)
| Kevin Durant (5)
| American Airlines Arena19,647
| 43–18
|- style="background:#fcc;"
| 62
| February 28
| @ Orlando
| 
| Stephen Curry (33)
| Demarcus Cousins (11)
| Stephen Curry (6)
| Amway Center18,846
| 43–19

|- style="background:#cfc;"
| 63
| March 2
| @ Philadelphia
| 
| Kevin Durant (34)
| Draymond Green (9)
| Draymond Green (10)
| Wells Fargo Center20,624
| 44–19
|- style="background:#fcc;"
| 64
| March 5
| Boston
| 
| Stephen Curry (23)
| Demarcus Cousins (9)
| Draymond Green (5)
| Oracle Arena19,596
| 44–20
|- style="background:#cfc;"
| 65
| March 8
| Denver
| 
| Klay Thompson (39)
| Draymond Green (10)
| Durant, Cousins (6)
| Oracle Arena19,596
| 45–20
|- style="background:#fcc;"
| 66
| March 10
| Phoenix
| 
| Klay Thompson (28)
| Draymond Green (11)
| Green, Curry (8)
| Oracle Arena19,596
| 45–21
|- style="background:#cfc;"
| 67
| March 13
| @ Houston
| 
| Klay Thompson (30)
| Demarcus Cousins (8)
| Demarcus Cousins (7)
| Toyota Center18,122
| 46–21
|- style="background:#cfc;"
| 68
| March 16
| @ Oklahoma City
| 
| Stephen Curry (33)
| Thompson, Green, Cousins (8)
| Green, Cousins (6)
| Chesapeake Energy Arena18,203
| 47–21
|- style="background:#fcc;"
| 69
| March 18
| @ San Antonio
| 
| Stephen Curry (25)
| Bogut, Curry (7)
| Stephen Curry (8)
| AT&T Center18,354
| 47–22
|- style="background:#cfc;"
| 70
| March 19
| @ Minnesota
| 
| Stephen Curry (36)
| Draymond Green (10)
| Green, Durant (9)
| Target Center17,964
| 48–22
|- style="background:#cfc;"
| 71
| March 21
| Indiana
| 
| Klay Thompson (18)
| Demarcus Cousins (11)
| Stephen Curry (7)
| Oracle Arena19,596
| 49–22
|- style="background:#fcc;"
| 72
| March 23
| Dallas
| 
| Kevin Durant (25)
| Cousins, Cook (6)
| Quinn Cook (7)
| Oracle Arena19,596
| 49–23
|- style="background:#cfc;"
| 73
| March 24
| Detroit
| 
| Stephen Curry (26)
| Stephen Curry (9)
| Kevin Durant (11)
| Oracle Arena19,596
| 50–23
|- style="background:#cfc;"
| 74
| March 27
| @ Memphis
| 
| Stephen Curry (28)
| Stephen Curry (10)
| Stephen Curry (7)
| FedExForum17,794
| 51–23
|- style="background:#fcc;"
| 75
| March 29
| @ Minnesota
| 
| Stephen Curry (37)
| Kevin Durant (12)
| Kevin Durant (7)
| Target Center18,978
| 51–24
|- style="background:#cfc;"
| 76
| March 31
| Charlotte
| 
| Stephen Curry (25)
| Andrew Bogut (8)
| Green, Durant (9)
| Oracle Arena19,596
| 52–24

|- style="background:#cfc;"
| 77
| April 2
| Denver
| 
| Demarcus Cousins (25)
| Demarcus Cousins (12)
| Draymond Green (9)
| Oracle Arena19,596
| 53–24
|- style="background:#cfc;"
| 78
| April 4
| @ L.A. Lakers
| 
| Demarcus Cousins (21)
| Cousins, Curry (10)
| Kevin Durant (8)
| Staples Center18,997
| 54–24
|- style="background:#cfc;"
| 79
| April 5
| Cleveland
| 
| Stephen Curry (40)
| Draymond Green (8)
| Kevin Durant (8)
| Oracle Arena19,596
| 55–24
|- style="background:#cfc;"
| 80
| April 7
| L.A. Clippers
| 
| Stephen Curry (27)
| Draymond Green (10)
| Draymond Green (9)
| Oracle Arena19,596
| 56–24
|- style="background:#cfc;"
| 81
| April 9
| @ New Orleans
| 
| Demarcus Cousins (21)
| Demarcus Cousins (12)
| Demarcus Cousins (6)
| Smoothie King Center17,090
| 57–24
|- style="background:#fcc;"
| 82
| April 10
| @ Memphis
| 
| Kevin Durant (21)
| Jordan Bell (8)
| Kevin Durant (6)
| FedExForum17,794
| 57–25

Playoffs

|- style="background:#cfc;"
| 1
| April 13
| L.A. Clippers
| 
| Stephen Curry (38)
| Stephen Curry (15)
| Curry, Green (7)
| Oracle Arena19,596
| 1–0
|- style="background:#fcc;"
| 2
| April 15
| L.A. Clippers
| 
| Stephen Curry (29)
| Andrew Bogut (9)
| Draymond Green (9)
| Oracle Arena19,596
| 1–1
|- style="background:#cfc;"
| 3
| April 18
| @ L.A. Clippers
| 
| Kevin Durant (38)
| Andrew Bogut (14)
| Draymond Green (10)
| Staples Center19,068
| 2–1
|- style="background:#cfc;"
| 4
| April 21
| @ L.A. Clippers
| 
| Kevin Durant (33)
| Bogut, Curry (10)
| Stephen Curry (7)
| Staples Center19,068
| 3–1
|- style="background:#fcc;"
| 5
| April 24
| L.A. Clippers
| 
| Kevin Durant (45)
| Green, Looney (7)
| Andre Iguodala (8)
| Oracle Arena19,596
| 3–2
|- style="background:#cfc;"
| 6
| April 26
| @ L.A. Clippers
| 
| Kevin Durant (50)
| Draymond Green (14)
| Draymond Green (10)
| Staples Center19,068
| 4–2

|- style="background:#cfc;"
| 1
| April 28
| Houston
| 
| Kevin Durant (35)
| Draymond Green (9)
| Draymond Green (9)
| Oracle Arena19,596
| 1–0
|- style="background:#cfc;"
| 2
| April 30
| Houston
| 
| Kevin Durant (29)
| Draymond Green (12)
| Draymond Green (7)
| Oracle Arena19,596
| 2–0
|- style="background:#fcc;"
| 3
| May 4
| @ Houston
| 
| Kevin Durant (46)
| Draymond Green (11)
| Draymond Green (10)
| Toyota Center18,169
| 2–1
|- style="background:#fcc;"
| 4
| May 6
| @ Houston
| 
| Kevin Durant (34)
| Draymond Green (10)
| Stephen Curry (8)
| Toyota Center18,169
| 2–2
|- style="background:#cfc;"
| 5
| May 8
| Houston
| 
| Klay Thompson (27)
| Draymond Green (12)
| Draymond Green (11)
| Oracle Arena19,596
| 3–2
|- style="background:#cfc;"
| 6
| May 10
| @ Houston
| 
| Stephen Curry (33)
| Draymond Green (10)
| Draymond Green (7)
| Toyota Center18,169
| 4–2

|- style="background:#cfc;"
| 1
| May 14
| Portland
| 
| Stephen Curry (36)
| Draymond Green (10)
| Stephen Curry (7)
| Oracle Arena19,596
| 1–0
|- style="background:#cfc;"
| 2
| May 16
| Portland
| 
| Stephen Curry (37)
| Draymond Green (10)
| Stephen Curry (8)
| Oracle Arena19,596
| 2–0
|- style="background:#cfc;"
| 3
| May 18
| @ Portland
| 
| Stephen Curry (36)
| Draymond Green (13)
| Draymond Green (12)
| Moda Center20,214
| 3–0
|- style="background:#cfc;"
| 4
| May 20
| @ Portland
| 
| Stephen Curry (37)
| Green, Looney (14)
| Green, Curry (11)
| Moda Center20,064
| 4–0

|- style="background:#fcc;"
| 1
| May 30
| @ Toronto
| 
| Stephen Curry (34)
| Draymond Green (10)
| Draymond Green (10)
| Scotiabank Arena19,983
| 0–1
|- style="background:#cfc;"
| 2
| June 2
| @ Toronto
| 
| Klay Thompson (25)
| Cousins, Green (10)
| Draymond Green (9)
| Scotiabank Arena20,014
| 1–1
|- style="background:#fcc;"
| 3
| June 5
| Toronto
| 
| Stephen Curry (47)
| Stephen Curry (8)
| Stephen Curry (7)
| Oracle Arena19,596
| 1–2
|- style="background:#fcc;"
| 4
| June 7
| Toronto
| 
| Klay Thompson (28)
| Draymond Green (9)
| Draymond Green (12)
| Oracle Arena19,596
| 1–3
|- style="background:#cfc;"
| 5
| June 10
| @ Toronto
| 
| Stephen Curry (31)
| Draymond Green (10)
| Draymond Green (8)
| Scotiabank Arena20,144
| 2–3
|- style="background:#fcc;"
| 6
| June 13
| Toronto
| 
| Klay Thompson (30)
| Draymond Green (19)
| Draymond Green (13)
| Oracle Arena19,596
| 2–4

Player statistics

Regular season

|-
| align="left"| || align="center"| C
| 68 || 3 || 788 || 184 || 76 || 20 || 51 || 223
|-
| align="left"|≠ || align="center"| C
| 11 || 5 || 134 || 55 || 11 || 3 || 8 || 39
|-
| align="left"| || align="center"| PG
| 74 || 10 || 1,059 || 157 || 116 || 20 || 3 || 509
|-
| align="left"| || align="center"| C
| 30 || 30 || 771 || 247 || 107 || 40 || 44 || 488
|-
| align="left"| || align="center"| PG
| 69 || 69 || 2,331 || 369 || 361 || 92 || 25 || 1,881
|-
| align="left"| || align="center"| PF
| 11 || 0 || 67 || 13 || 1 || 0 || 1 || 46
|-
| align="left"| || align="center"| SF
| 78 || style=";"|78 || style=";"|2,702 || style=";"|497 || style=";"|457 || 58 || style=";"|84 || style=";"|2,027
|-
| align="left"| || align="center"| SG
| 30 || 1 || 204 || 25 || 23 || 5 || 3 || 40
|-
| align="left"| || align="center"| PF
| 66 || 66 || 2,065 || 481 || 454 || style=";"|95 || 70 || 486
|-
| align="left"| || align="center"| SF
| 68 || 13 || 1,578 || 252 || 216 || 61 || 51 || 389
|-
| align="left"| || align="center"| PF
| 73 || 6 || 1,218 || 288 || 96 || 27 || 18 || 459
|-
| align="left"| || align="center"| C
| 24 || 22 || 410 || 75 || 28 || 12 || 25 || 130
|-
| align="left"| || align="center"| SG
| 32 || 0 || 375 || 64 || 13 || 13 || 0 || 158
|-
| align="left"| || align="center"| PG
| 64 || 0 || 967 || 117 || 114 || 31 || 27 || 258
|-
| align="left"| || align="center"| C
| style=";"|80 || 24 || 1,481 || 417 || 123 || 46 || 53 || 500
|-
| align="left"| || align="center"| SF
| 72 || 5 || 1,003 || 247 || 31 || 18 || 15 || 337
|-
| align="left"| || align="center"| SG
| 78 || style=";"|78 || 2,652 || 299 || 186 || 84 || 47 || 1,680
|}
After all games.
‡Waived during the season
†Traded during the season
≠Acquired during the season

Playoffs

|-
| align="left"| || align="center"| C
| 15 || 2 || 106 || 19 || 11 || 4 || 7 || 41
|-
| align="left"| || align="center"| C
| 19 || 6 || 179 || 74 || 21 || 5 || 6 || 52
|-
| align="left"| || align="center"| PG
| 17 || 0 || 193 || 18 || 12 || 3 || 1 || 71
|-
| align="left"| || align="center"| C
| 8 || 5 || 133 || 39 || 19 || 5 || 6 || 61
|-
| align="left"| || align="center"| PG
| style=";"|22 || style=";"|22 || 846 || 132 || 126 || 24 || 4 || style=";"|620
|-
| align="left"| || align="center"| SF
| 12 || 12 || 442 || 59 || 54 || 13 || 12 || 387
|-
| align="left"| || align="center"| SG
| 7 || 0 || 18 || 1 || 1 || 0 || 0 || 5
|-
| align="left"| || align="center"| PF
| style=";"|22 || style=";"|22 || style=";"|851 || style=";"|223 || style=";"|187 || style=";"|32 || style=";"|33 || 292
|-
| align="left"| || align="center"| SF
| 21 || 15 || 629 || 91 || 83 || 24 || 23 || 206
|-
| align="left"| || align="center"| PF
| 16 || 0 || 121 || 34 || 12 || 1 || 2 || 34
|-
| align="left"| || align="center"| C
| 4 || 1 || 8 || 2 || 0 || 0 || 0 || 3
|-
| align="left"| || align="center"| PG
| style=";"|22 || 2 || 322 || 31 || 31 || 10 || 4 || 89
|-
| align="left"| || align="center"| C
| 21 || 1 || 432 || 94 || 20 || 12 || 11 || 149
|-
| align="left"| || align="center"| SF
| style=";"|22 || 1 || 235 || 50 || 4 || 2 || 1 || 66
|-
| align="left"| || align="center"| SG
| 21 || 21 || 818 || 86 || 44 || 28 || 15 || 435
|}

Transactions

Free agency

Re-signed

Additions

Subtractions

Awards

Notes

References

Golden State Warriors seasons
Golden State Warriors
Golden State Warriors
Golden State Warriors
Western Conference (NBA) championship seasons